Overhill is a 2013 British horror thriller film, directed by Will Hutchinson and starring Lorna Beckett. The story focuses on Londoner, Rebecca, who takes Overhill cottage in Pendeen as a quiet and secluded place to get her novel finished. She quickly finds that the locals know more about her than she anticipated, and peace is in short supply.

Plot

Cast

Production
Set and largely shot over four days in 2011 in the village of Pendeen in Cornwall, and featuring many local actors, it was completed for just £600.

Release
The film had its worldwide premiere at the East End Film Festival on Thursday 27 June 2013, followed by a question-and-answer session with director Will Hutchinson, writer Leo Whetter and Guardian journalist David Stubbs.

Reception

References

External links
 
 

2013 films
2013 horror films
Films set in Cornwall
Films shot in Cornwall
British independent films
2013 directorial debut films
2010s English-language films
2010s British films